Mikhail Yuryevich Biryukov (born 7 May 1958) is a retired Soviet and Russian football player. He works as a goalkeeping coach for FC Zenit St. Petersburg.

Honours
 Soviet Premier League winner: 1984
 Best Soviet Goalkeeper title: 1984

International career
Biryukov made his debut for USSR on 19 August 1984 in a friendly against Mexico.

External links
 Profile 

1958 births
Living people
Soviet footballers
Soviet Union international footballers
Russian footballers
Russian expatriate footballers
Expatriate footballers in Finland
Expatriate footballers in Estonia
Soviet Top League players
Veikkausliiga players
FC Zenit Saint Petersburg players
Myllykosken Pallo −47 players
FC TVMK players
FC Nikol Tallinn players
Russian football managers
FC Zenit Saint Petersburg managers
Russian Premier League managers
FC Zenit Saint Petersburg non-playing staff
People from Orekhovo-Zuyevo
Honoured Coaches of Russia
Association football goalkeepers
FC Lokomotiv Saint Petersburg players
Association football goalkeeping coaches
FC Znamya Truda Orekhovo-Zuyevo players
FC Amur Blagoveshchensk players
Sportspeople from Moscow Oblast